Beat of the City is a 1975 Australian TV series based on the novel by H.F. Brinsmead.

References

External links
Beat of the City at IMDb

Australian Broadcasting Corporation original programming
Australian drama television series
1975 Australian television series debuts